On March 1, 1984 the Italian Institute for Disarmament, Development and Peace (Istituto di ricerche per il disarmo, lo sviluppo e la pace (IRDISP) in Rome (a think tank of the Radical Party) published the entire Italian Army order of battle (OrBat) down to company level – this was justified by the radical party as one of its core demands was total disarmament of Europe, even though the data which was published was top secret. The Radical Party dissolved in 1989 (its parliamentarians had passed along the data) and the IRDISP followed suit in 1990. But Radio Radicale has survived, and the OrBat can still be found today on the homepage of the radio.

OrBat published by Istituto di ricerche per il disarmo, lo sviluppo e la pace (IRDISP) in Rome on March 1, 1984.

Army General Staff

3rd Army Corps 
  3rd Army Corps, in Milan:
 3rd Command Battalion, in Milan
 4th Infantry (Training) Battalion Guastalla, in Asti
 72nd Infantry (Training) Battalion Puglie, in Albenga
 Horse Artillery Regiment Le Voloire, in Milan
 Command Battery, in Milan
 1st Self-propelled Group, Horse Artillery Regiment, (M109 155mm self-propelled howitzers), in Milan
 2nd (Reserve) Self-propelled Group, Horse Artillery Regiment, (M109 155mm self-propelled howitzers), in Milan
 3rd Self-propelled Group, Horse Artillery Regiment, (M109 155mm self-propelled howitzers), in Cremona
 3rd Battery, 30th Artillery Specialists Group Brianza, in Milan
 3rd Army Light Aviation Regiment Aldebaran, at Bresso Air Base
 23rd Reconnaissance Helicopter Squadrons Group Eridano, at Bresso Air Base, (AB-206 helicopters)
 53rd Medium Helicopter Squadrons Group Cassiopea, at Padua Air Base, (AB-205 helicopters)
 3rd Pioneer Battalion Lario, in Pavia
 3rd Signal Battalion Spluga, in Milan
 3rd Logistic Maneuver Battalion Fulvia, in Milan
  Motorized Brigade Cremona, in Turin
 Cremona Command and Signal Battalion, in Turin
 1st Armored Squadrons Group Nizza Cavalleria, in Pinerolo, (with a mix of Leopard 1A2 main battle tanks and VCC-2 armored personnel carriers)
 21st Motorized Infantry Battalion Alfonsine, in Alessandria
 22nd Motorized Infantry Battalion Primaro, in Fossano
 50th (Reserve) Motorized Infantry Battalion Parma, in Fossano
 157th Motorized Infantry Battalion Liguria, in Novi Ligure
 7th Field Artillery Group Adria, in Turin, (M114 155mm towed howitzers)
 Cremona Logistic Battalion, in Turin
 Cremona Anti-tank Company, in Pinerolo
 Cremona Engineer Company, in Pinerolo

Armored Division Centauro 
  Armored Division Centauro, in Novara
 15th Reconnaissance Squadrons Group Cavalleggeri di Lodi, in Lenta (Leopard 1A2 main battle tanks and VCC-2 armored personnel carriers)
 26th Infantry (Training) Battalion Bergamo, in Diano Castello
 131st Heavy Field Artillery Group Vercelli, in Vercelli, (FH70 155mm towed howitzers)
 205th Heavy Field Artillery Group Lomellina, in Vercelli, (FH70 155mm towed howitzers)
 Artillery Specialists Group Centauro, in Vercelli
 11th Light Anti-aircraft Artillery Group Falco, in Vercelli
 46th Reconnaissance Helicopter Squadrons Group Sagittario, at Vercelli Air Base, (AB-206 helicopters)
 131st Pioneer Battalion Ticino, in Bellinzago Novarese
 231st Signal Battalion Sempione, in Novara
 Logistic Maneuver Battalion Centauro, in Novara
  3rd Mechanized Brigade Goito in Milan
 Goito Command and Signal Battalion, in Milan
 4th Tank Battalion M.O. Passalacqua, in Solbiate Olona, (Leopard 1A2 main battle tanks)
 6th Bersaglieri Battalion Palestro, in Turin, (VCC-2 armored personnel carriers)
 10th Bersaglieri Battalion Bezzecca, in Solbiate Olona, (VCC-2 armored personnel carriers)
 18th Bersaglieri Battalion Poggio Scanno, in Milan, (VCC-2 armored personnel carriers)
 3rd Self-propelled Field Artillery Group Pastrengo, in Vercelli, (M109 155mm self-propelled howitzers)
 Goito Logistic Battalion, in Monza
 Goito Anti-tank Company, in Turin
 Goito Engineer Company, in Novara
  31st Armored Brigade Curtatone, in Bellinzago Novarese
 Curtatone Command and Signal Battalion, in Bellinzago Novarese
 1st Tank Battalion M.O. Cracco, in Bellinzago Novarese, (Leopard 1A2 main battle tanks)
 101st Tank Battalion M.O. Zappalà, in Bellinzago Novarese, (Leopard 1A2 main battle tanks)
 28th Bersaglieri Battalion Oslavia, in Bellinzago Novarese, (VCC-2 armored personnel carriers)
 9th Self-propelled Field Artillery Group Brennero, in Vercelli, (M109 155mm self-propelled howitzers)
 Curtatone Logistic Battalion, in Bellinzago Novarese
 Curtatone Anti-tank Company, in Bellinzago Novarese
 Curtatone Engineer Company, in Novara
  Mechanized Brigade Legnano, in Bergamo
 Legnano Command and Signal Battalion, in Bergamo
 20th Tank Battalion M.O. Pentimalli, in Legnano, (Leopard 1A2 main battle tanks)
 2nd Bersaglieri Battalion Governolo, in Legnano, (M113 armored personnel carriers)
 67th Mechanized Infantry Battalion Montelungo, in Monza, (M113 armored personnel carriers)
 68th Mechanized Infantry Battalion Palermo, in Bergamo, (M113 armored personnel carriers)
 11th Field Artillery Group Monferrato, in Cremona, (M114 155mm towed howitzers)
 Legnano Logistic Battalion, in Presezzo
 Legnano Anti-tank Company, in Monza
 Legnano Engineer Company, in Bergamo

4th Alpine Army Corps 
 4th Alpine Army Corps, in Bolzano:
 4th Alpine Army Corps Command Battalion, in Bolzano
 4th Heavy Field Artillery Regiment, in Trento
 Command Battery
 1st Group, 4th Heavy Field Artillery Regiment, (FH70 155mm towed howitzers)
 2nd Group, 4th Heavy Field Artillery Regiment, (FH70 155mm towed howitzers)
 10th Self-propelled Field Artillery Group Avisio, in Trento, (M109 155mm self-propelled howitzers),
 4th Artillery Specialists Group Bondone, in Trento
 2nd Mining Engineer Battalion Iseo, in Bolzano
 4th Pioneer Battalion Orta, in Trento
 4th Signal Battalion Gardena, in Bolzano
 7th Signal Company, in Bassano
 4th Army Aviation Regiment "Altair", at Bolzano-San Giacomo Air Base
 24th Light Airplanes and Helicopter Squadrons Group Orione, at Bolzano-San Giacomo Air Base, (SM-1019 planes and AB-206 helicopters)
 34th Reconnaissance Helicopter Squadrons Group Toro, at Venaria Reale Air Base and at Aosta-Pollein Air Base, (AB-205 and AB-206 helicopters)
 44th Reconnaissance Helicopter Squadrons Group Fenice, at Belluno Air Base, (AB-205 and AB-206 helicopters)
 54th Medium Helicopter Squadrons Group Cefeo, at Bolzano-San Giacomo Air Base, (AB-205 helicopters)
 3rd Armored Squadrons Group Savoia Cavalleria, in Merano, (with a mix of Leopard 1A2 main battle tanks and VCC-2 armored personnel carriers)
 4th Maneuver Logistic Battalion Dolomiti, in Bolzano
 7th Armored Carabinieri Battalion M.O. Petrucelli, in Laives, (M47 Patton tanks and M113 armored personnel carriers)
 Alpini Parachute Company, in Eppan
  Alpine Brigade Cadore, in Belluno
 Cadore Command and Signal Battalion, in Belluno
 Alpini Battalion Feltre, in Feltre
 Alpini Battalion Pieve di Cadore, in Tai di Cadore (68th Company based in Santo Stefano di Cadore and 75th Company at Pieve di Cadore)
 Alpini (Training) Battalion Belluno, in Belluno
 Mountain Artillery Group Lanzo, in Belluno, (M56 105mm pack howitzers)
 Mountain Artillery Group Agordo, in Bassano del Grappa, (M114 155mm towed howitzers)
 Cadore Logistic Battalion, in Belluno
 Cadore Anti-tank Company, in Belluno
 Cadore Engineer Company, in Belluno
  Alpine Brigade Julia, in Udine
 Julia Command and Signal Battalion, in Udine
 Alpini Battalion Cividale, in Chiusaforte
 Alpini Battalion Gemona, in Tarvisio
 Alpini Battalion L'Aquila, in L'Aquila
 Alpini Battalion Tolmezzo, in Paluzza (6th Company based in Forni Avoltri)
 Alpini Battalion Val Tagliamento, in Tolmezzo (16x companies, over 2000 men in strength)
 Alpini (Training) Battalion Vicenza, in Codroipo (61st Company based in Teramo)
 Mountain Artillery Group Belluno, in Pontebba, (M56 105mm pack howitzers)
 Mountain Artillery Group Udine, in Tolmezzo, (M56 105mm pack howitzers)
 Mountain Artillery Group Conegliano, in Udine, (M114 155mm towed howitzers)
 Julia Logistic Battalion, in Udine
 Julia Anti-tank Company, in Cavazzo Carnico
 Julia Engineer Company, in Gemona
  Alpine Brigade Orobica, in Meran
 Orobica Command and Signal Battalion, in Meran
 Alpini Battalion Morbegno, in Sterzing
 Alpini Battalion Tirano, in Mals
 Alpini (Training) Battalion Edolo, in Meran
 Mountain Artillery Group Bergamo, in Schlanders, (M56 105mm pack howitzers)
 Mountain Artillery Group Sondrio, in Sterzing, (M114 155mm towed howitzers)
 Orobica Logistic Battalion, in Meran
 Orobica Anti-tank Company, in Meran
 Orobica Engineer Company, in Meran
  Alpine Brigade Taurinense, in Turin
 Taurinense Command and Signal Battalion, in Turin
 Alpini Battalion Aosta, in Aosta
 Alpini Battalion Saluzzo, in Borgo San Dalmazzo
 Alpini Battalion Susa, in Pinerolo
 Alpini (Training) Battalion Mondovì, in Cuneo
 Mountain Artillery Group Aosta, in Saluzzo, (M114 155mm towed howitzers)
 Mountain Artillery Group Pinerolo, in Susa, (M56 105mm pack howitzers)
 Taurinense Logistic Battalion, in Rivoli
 Taurinense Anti-tank Company, in Turin
 Taurinense Engineer Company, in Abbadia Alpina
  Alpine Brigade Tridentina, in Brixen
 Tridentina Command and Signal Battalion, in Brixen
 Alpini Battalion Bassano, in Innichen
 Alpini Battalion Trento, in Welsberg
 Alpini (Fortification) Battalion Val Brenta, in Bruneck
 Mountain Artillery Group Asiago, in Toblach, (M56 105mm pack howitzers)
 Mountain Artillery Group Vicenza, in Elvas, (M114 155mm towed howitzers)
 Tridentina Logistic Battalion, in Vahrn
 Tridentina Anti-tank Company, in Bruneck
 Tridentina Engineer Company, in Brixen

5th Army Corps 
 5th Army Corps, in Vittorio Veneto:
 5th Command Battalion, in Vittorio Veneto
 7th Infantry (Training) Battalion Cuneo, in Udine
 48th Infantry (Training) Battalion Ferrara, in Bari
 5th Army Light Aviation Regiment Rigel, at Casarsa della Delizia Air Base
 25th Light Airplanes and Helicopter Squadrons Group Cigno, at Casarsa della Delizia Air Base, (AB-206 helicopters)
 55th Medium Helicopter Squadrons Group Dragone, at Casarsa della Delizia Air Base, (AB-205 helicopters)
 1st Mining Engineer Battalion Garda, in Udine
 3rd Sapper Battalion Verbano, in Udine
 5th Pioneer Battalion Bolsena, in Udine
 5th Signal Battalion Rolle, in Sacile
 33rd Electronic Warfare Battalion Falzarego, in Conegliano
 5th Maneuver Logistic Battalion Postumia, in Pordenone
 13th Armored Carabinieri Battalion M.O. Gallo, in Gorizia, (Leopard 1A2 main battle tanks and VCC-2 armored personnel carriers)
  3rd Missile Brigade Aquileia, in Portogruaro
 Command Battalion, in Portogruaro
 27th Heavy Self-propelled Artillery Regiment, in Udine
 1st Group, 27th Heavy Self-propelled Artillery Regiment, in Udine, (M110 203mm self-propelled howitzers)
 2nd Group, 27th Heavy Self-propelled Artillery Regiment, in San Bernardo-Udine, (M110 203mm self-propelled howitzers)
 1st (Reserve) Heavy Artillery Group Adige, in Verona, (M115 203mm towed howitzers)
 3rd Missile Group Volturno, in Oderzo (HQ and 1st Battery) and Codogné (2nd and 3rd Battery), (MGM-52 Lance tactical ballistic missiles)
 9th Heavy Artillery Group Rovigo, in Verona, (M115 203mm towed howitzers)
 13th Target Acquisition Group, in Verona
 13th Signal Battalion Mauria, in Portogruaro
 13th Maneuver Logistic Battalion, in Portogruaro
 41st Artillery Specialists Group Cordenons, in Pordenone
 92nd Infantry (Training) Battalion Basilicata, in Foligno
 1st Fusilier Company Aquileia, in Codogné
 2nd Fusilier Company Aquileia, in Vicenza
 3rd Fusilier Company Aquileia, in Oderzo
 Engineer Company Aquileia, in Vicenza
  Trieste Military Command, in Trieste
 Trieste Command and Signal Battalion, in Trieste
 1st Motorized Infantry Battalion San Giusto, in Trieste, (Included one mechanized company with M113 armored personnel carriers)
 43rd (Reserve) Motorized Infantry Battalion Forlì, in Trieste
 255th (Reserve) Motorized Infantry Battalion Veneto, in Trieste
 14th Field Artillery Group Murge, in Trieste, with M114 155mm towed howitzers
 Trieste Troops Recruit Training Company, in Trieste
 Trieste Troops Engineer Platoon, in Trieste
 554th Multirole Helicopter Squadron, in Prosecco
 Logistics Base, in Muggia

Armored Division Ariete 
  Armored Division Ariete, in Pordenone
 14th Bersaglieri (Training) Battalion Sernaglia, in Albenga
 16th Infantry (Training) Battalion Savona, in Savona
 19th Reconnaissance Squadrons Group Cavalleggeri Guide, in Casarsa della Delizia (with a mix of Leopard 1A2 main battle tanks and VCC-1 armored personnel carriers)
 108th Heavy Field Artillery Group Cosseria, in Casarsa della Delizia, (FH70 155mm towed howitzers)
 132nd Heavy Field Artillery Group Rovereto, in Casarsa della Delizia, (FH70 155mm towed howitzers)
 Artillery Specialists Group Ariete, in Casarsa della Delizia
 14th (Reserve) Light Anti-aircraft Artillery Group Astore, in Casarsa della Delizia
 49th Reconnaissance Helicopter Squadrons Group Capricorno, in Casarsa della Delizia, (AB-205)
 132nd Pioneer Battalion Livenza, in Motta di Livenza
 232nd Signal Battalion Fadalto, in Casarsa della Delizia
 Maneuver Logistic Battalion Ariete, in Casarsa della Delizia
  8th Mechanized Brigade Garibaldi, in Pordenone
 Garibaldi Command and Signal Battalion, in Pordenone
 7th Tank Battalion M.O. Di Dio, in Vivaro, (M60A1 main battle tanks)
 3rd Bersaglieri Battalion Cernaia, in Pordenone, (VCC-1 armored personnel carriers)
 11th Bersaglieri Battalion Caprera, in Orcenico Superiore, (VCC-1 armored personnel carriers)
 26th Bersaglieri Battalion Castelfidardo, in Maniago, (VCC-1 armored personnel carriers)
 19th Self-propelled Field Artillery Group Rialto, in Sequals, (M109 155mm self-propelled howitzers)
 Garibaldi Logistic Battalion, in Pordenone
 Garibaldi Anti-tank Company, in Vivaro
 Garibaldi Engineer Company, in Orcenico Superiore
  32nd Armored Brigade Mameli, in Tauriano
 Mameli Command and Signal Battalion, in Tauriano
 3rd Tank Battalion M.O. Galas, in Tauriano, (M60A1 main battle tanks)
 5th Tank Battalion M.O. Chiamenti, in Tauriano, (M60A1 main battle tanks)
 23rd Bersaglieri Battalion Castel di Borgo, in Tauriano, (VCC-1 armored personnel carriers)
 12th Self-propelled Field Artillery Group Capua, in Vacile, (M109 155mm self-propelled howitzers)
Mameli Logistic Battalion, in Vacile
 Mameli Anti-tank Company, in Vacile
 Mameli Engineer Company, in Vacile
  132nd Armored Brigade Manin, in Aviano
 Manin Command and Signal Battalion, in Aviano
 8th Tank Battalion M.O. Secchiaroli, in Aviano, (M60A1 main battle tanks)
 10th Tank Battalion M.O. Bruno, in Aviano, (M60A1 main battle tanks)
 27th Bersaglieri Battalion Jamiano, in Aviano, (VCC-1 armored personnel carriers)
 20th Self-propelled Field Artillery Group Piave, in Maniago, (M109 155mm self-propelled howitzers)
 Manin Logistic Battalion, in Maniago
 Manin Anti-tank Company, in Aviano
 Manin Engineer Company, in Maniago

Mechanized Division Mantova 
  Mechanized Division Mantova, in Udine
 7th Reconnaissance Squadrons Group Lancieri di Milano, in Orzano di Remanzacco (with a mix of Leopard 1A2 main battle tanks and VCC-1 armored personnel carriers)
 11th Infantry (Training) Battalion Casale, in Casale Monferrato
 52nd Infantry (Fortification) Battalion Alpi, in Attimis
 73rd Infantry (Fortification) Battalion Lombardia, in Arzene
 5th Heavy Field Artillery Group Superga, in Udine, (FH70 155mm towed howitzers)
 155th Heavy Field Artillery Group Emilia, in Udine, (FH70 155mm towed howitzers)
 5th Artillery Specialists Group Mantova, in Udine
 12th (Reserve) Light Anti-aircraft Artillery Group Nibbio, in Udine
 48th Reconnaissance Helicopter Squadrons Group Pavone, in Campoformido, (AB-205)
 104th Pioneer Battalion Torre, in Remanzacco|Orzano di Remanzacco
 107th Signal Battalion Predil, in Udine
 Maneuver Logistic Battalion Mantova, in Orzano di Remanzacco
  Mechanized Brigade Brescia, in Brescia
 Brescia Command and Signal Battalion, in Brescia
 13th Tank Battalion M.O. Pascucci, in Cordenons, (Leopard 1A2 main battle tanks)
 20th Mechanized Infantry Battalion Monte San Michele, in Brescia, (M113 armored personnel carriers)
 30th Mechanized Infantry Battalion Pisa, in Montorio Veronese, (M113 armored personnel carriers)
 85th Mechanized Infantry Battalion Verona, in Montorio Veronese, (M113 armored personnel carriers)
 52nd Field Artillery Group Venaria, in Brescia, (M114 155mm towed howitzers)
 [Brescia Logistic Battalion, in Montorio Veronese
 Brescia Anti-tank Company, in Montorio Veronese
 Brescia Engineer Company, in Montorio Veronese
  Mechanized Brigade Isonzo, in Cividale del Friuli
 Isonzo Command and Signal Battalion, in Cividale del Friuli
 63rd Tank Battalion M.O. Fioritto, in Cordenons, (Leopard 1A2 main battle tanks)
 59th Mechanized Infantry Battalion Calabria, in Cividale del Friuli, (M113 armored personnel carriers)
 76th Mechanized Infantry Battalion Napoli, in Cividale del Friuli, (M113 armored personnel carriers)
 114th Mechanized Infantry Battalion Moriago, in Tricesimo, (M113 armored personnel carriers)
 120th Infantry (Fortification) Battalion Fornovo, in Ipplis
 28th Self-propelled Field Artillery Group Livorno, in Tarcento, (M109 155mm self-propelled howitzers)
 Isonzo Logistic Battalion, in Tricesimo
 Isonzo Anti-tank Company, in Tarcento
 Isonzo Engineer Company, in Tarcento
  Armored Brigade Pozzuolo del Friuli, in Palmanova
 Pozzuolo del Friuli Command and Signal Battalion, in Palmanova
 4th Mechanized Squadrons Group Genova Cavalleria, in Palmanova, (VCC-1 armored personnel carriers)
 5th Tank Squadrons Group Lancieri di Novara, in Codroipo, (Leopard 1A2 main battle tanks)
 28th Tank Squadrons Group Cavalleggeri di Treviso, in Palmanova, (Leopard 1A2 main battle tanks)
 120th Self-propelled Field Artillery Group Po, in Palmanova, (M109 155mm self-propelled howitzers)
 Pozzuolo del Friuli Logistic Battalion, in Visco
 Pozzuolo del Friuli Anti-tank Squadron, in Palmanova
 Pozzuolo del Friuli Engineer Company, in Palmanova

Mechanized Division Folgore 
  Mechanized Division Folgore, in Treviso
 12th Reconnaissance Squadrons Group Cavalleggeri di Saluzzo, in Gorizia (with a mix of Leopard 1A2 main battle tanks and VCC-1 armored personnel carriers)
 28th Infantry (Training) Battalion Pavia, in Pesaro
 53rd Infantry (Fortification) Battalion Umbria, in Pavia di Udine
 33rd Heavy Field Artillery Group Terni, in Treviso, (FH70 155mm towed howitzers)
 184th Heavy Field Artillery Group Filottrano, in Padova, (FH70 155mm towed howitzers)
 Artillery Specialists Group Folgore, in Treviso
 13th (Reserve) Light Anti-aircraft Artillery Group Condor, in Treviso
 47th Reconnaissance Helicopter Squadrons Group Levrieri, in Treviso, (AB-206 helicopters)
 184th Pioneer Battalion Santerno, in Villa Vicentina
 184th Signal Battalion Cansiglio, in Treviso
 Maneuver Logistic Battalion Folgore, in Treviso
 Amphibious Troops Command (Lagunari), in Venice-Lido
 Command and Signal Battalion, in Venice-Lido
 1st Lagunari Battalion Serenissima, in Malcontenta, (VCC-2 armored personnel carriers)
 Amphibious Battalion Sile, in San Andrea, (LVTP-7 tracked amphibious personnel carriers)
 Recruits Training Company, in Venice-Lido
  Mechanized Brigade Gorizia, in Gorizia
 Gorizia Command and Signal Battalion, in Gorizia
 22nd Tank Battalion M.O. Piccinini, in San Vito al Tagliamento, (Leopard 1A2 main battle tanks)
 33rd Infantry (Fortification) Battalion Ardenza, in Fogliano Redipuglia
 41st Mechanized Infantry Battalion Modena, in Villa Vicentina, (VCC-2 armored personnel carriers)
 63rd Infantry (Fortification) Battalion Cagliari, in San Lorenzo Isontino
 82nd Mechanized Infantry Battalion Turin, in Cormons, (VCC-2 armored personnel carriers)
 183rd Mechanized Infantry Battalion Nembo, in Gradisca d'Isonzo, (VCC-2 armored personnel carriers)
 46th Self-propelled Field Artillery Group Trento, in Gradisca d'Isonzo, (M109 155mm self-propelled howitzers)
 Gorizia Logistic Battalion, in Gradisca d'Isonzo
 Gorizia Anti-tank Company, in Gorizia
 Gorizia Engineer Company, in Cormons
  Mechanized Brigade Trieste, in Bologna
 Trieste Command and Signal Battalion, in Bologna
 11th Tank Battalion M.O. Calzecchi, in Ozzano dell'Emilia, (Leopard 1A2 main battle tanks)
 37th Mechanized Infantry Battalion Ravenna, in Bologna, (VCC-2 armored personnel carriers)
 40th Mechanized Infantry Battalion Bologna, in Bologna, (VCC-2 armored personnel carriers)
 66th Mechanized Infantry Battalion Valtellina, in Forlì, (VCC-2 armored personnel carriers)
 21st Artillery Group Romagna, in Bologna, (M114 155mm towed howitzers)
 Trieste Logistic Battalion, in Budrio
 Trieste Anti-tank Company, in Bologna
 Trieste Engineer Company, in Bologna
  Armored Brigade Vittorio Veneto, in Villa Opicina
 Vittorio Veneto Command and Signal Battalion, in Villa Opicina
 2nd Mechanized Squadrons Group Piemonte Cavalleria, in Villa Opicina, (VCC-2 armored personnel carriers)
 6th Tank Squadrons Group Lancieri di Aosta, in Cervignano del Friuli, (Leopard 1A2 main battle tanks)
 9th Tank Squadrons Group Lancieri di Firenze, in Sgonico, (Leopard 1A2 main battle tanks)
 8th Self-propelled Field Artillery Group Pasubio, in Banne, (M109 155mm self-propelled howitzers)
 Vittorio Veneto Logistic Battalion, in Cervignano del Friuli
 Vittorio Veneto Anti-tank Squadron, in Banne
 Vittorio Veneto Engineer Company, in Cervignano del Friuli

I Military Territorial Command 
 I Military Territorial Command (North-West Military Region), in Turin, responsible for the regions Piedmont, Aosta, Liguria and Lombardy
 23rd Infantry (Training) Battalion Como, in Como
 41st Signal Battalion Fréjus, in Turin
 1st Mixed Transport Battalion Monviso, in Turin

V Military Territorial Command 
 V Military Territorial Command (North-East Military Region), in Padua, responsible for the regions Veneto, Friuli-Venezia Giulia and Trentino-Alto Adige/Südtirol
 32nd Signal Battalion Valles, in Padua
 42nd Signal Battalion Pordoi, in Padua
 23rd Signal Company, in Castelnuovo del Garda providing communication services at the secret West Star bunker complex, which in case of war would have housed NATO's COMLANDSOUTH (Command Allied Land Forces Southern Europe) and COMFIVEATAF (Command 5th Allied Tactical Air Force)
 14th Mixed Transport Battalion Flavia, in Montorio Veronese

VII Military Territorial Command 
 VII Military Territorial Command (Tuscan-Emilian Military Region), in Florence, responsible for the regions Tuscany and Emilia-Romagna
 8th Heavy Field Artillery Regiment, in Modena
 1st Group, 8th Heavy Field Artillery Regiment, in Modena, (M114 155mm towed howitzers)
 2nd Group, 8th Heavy Field Artillery Regiment, in Modena, (M114 155mm towed howitzers)
 84th Infantry (Training) Battalion Venezia, in Falconara Marittima
 43rd Signal Battalion Abetone, in Florence
 7th Mixed Transport Battalion, in Florence
 27th Light Airplanes and Helicopter Squadrons Group Mercurio, at Florence-Peretola Air Base, (SM-1019 planes and AB-206 helicopters)
  Paratroopers Brigade Folgore, in Livorno
 Folgore Command and Signal Battalion, in Livorno
 1st Carabinieri Paratroopers Battalion Tuscania, in Livorno
 2nd Paratroopers Battalion Tarquinia, in Livorno
 5th Paratroopers Battalion El Alamein, in Siena
 9th Paratroopers Assault Battalion Col Moschin, in Livorno
 185th Paratroopers Field Artillery Group Viterbo, in Livorno, (M56 105mm pack howitzers)
 Military Parachute School, in Pisa
 3rd Paratroopers (Training) Battalion Poggio Rusco, in Pisa
 Folgore Paratroopers Logistic Battalion, in Pisa
 26th Light Airplanes and Helicopter Squadrons Group Giove, at Pisa-San Giusto Air Base, (SM-1019 planes and AB-206 helicopters)
 Folgore Paratroopers Engineer Company, in Lucca
  Motorized Brigade Friuli, in Florence
 Friuli Command and Signal Battalion, in Florence
 19th Armored Battalion M.O. Tumiati, in Florence, (with a mix of Leopard 1A2 main battle tanks and M113 armored personnel carriers)
 35th Motorized (Reserve) Infantry Battalion Pistoia, in Pistoia
 78th Motorized Infantry Battalion Lupi di Toscana, in Scandicci
 87th Motorized Infantry Battalion Senio, in Pistoia
 225th Infantry (Training) Battalion Arezzo, in Arezzo
 35th Field Artillery Group Riolo in Pistoia, (M114 155mm towed howitzers)
 Friuli Logistic Battalion, in Coverciano
 Friuli Anti-tank Company, in Scandicci
 Friuli Engineer Company, in Florence

VIII Military Territorial Command 
 VIII Military Territorial Command (Central Military Region), in Rome, responsible for the regions Lazio, Molise, Marche, Abruzzo and Umbria
 Cavalry and Infantry School, in Cesano
 77th Tank (Training) Battalion M.O. Mattei, in Cesano
 Artillery School, in Bracciano
 1st Field Artillery (Training) Group Cacciatore delle Alpi, in Bracciano
 18th Self-propelled Field Artillery (Training) Group Gran Sasso, in Bracciano
 Engineer School, in Rome
 4th Engineer (Training) Battalion, in Rome
 8th Armored Squadrons Group Lancieri di Montebello, in Rome, (with a mix of Leopard 1A2 main battle tanks and M113 armored personnel carriers)
 80th Infantry (Training) Battalion Roma, in Cassino
 6th Engineer Battalion Trasimeno, in Rome
 11th Signal Battalion Leonessa, in Civitavecchia
 44th Signal Battalion Penne, in Rome
 28th Light Airplanes and Helicopter Squadrons Group Tucano, at Rome-Urbe Air Base, (SM-1019 planes and AB-206 helicopters)
 8th Mixed Transport Battalion Casilina, in Rome
  Motorized Brigade Acqui, in L'Aquila
 Acqui Command and Signal Battalion, in L'Aquila
 9th Armored Battalion M.O. Butera, in L'Aquila, (with a mix of Leopard 1A2 main battle tanks and M113 armored personnel carriers)
 17th Infantry (Training) Battalion San Martino, in Sulmona
 57th Motorized Infantry Battalion Abruzzi, in Sora
 70th Motorized (Reserve) Infantry Battalion Ancona, in Sulmona
 130th Motorized Infantry Battalion Perugia, in Spoleto
 48th Field Artillery Group Taro, in L'Aquila, (M114 155mm towed howitzers)
 Acqui Logistic Battalion, in L'Aquila
 Acqui Anti-tank Company, in L'Aquila
 Acqui Engineer Company, in L'Aquila
  Mechanized Brigade Granatieri di Sardegna, in Rome
 Granatieri di Sardegna Command and Signal Battalion in Rome
 6th Tank Battalion M.O. Scapuzzi, in Civitavecchia, (Leopard 1A2 main battle tanks)
 1st Bersaglieri Battalion La Marmora, in Civitavecchia, (VCC-2 armored personnel carriers)
 1st Mechanized Granatieri Battalion Assietta, in Rome, (VCC-1 armored personnel carriers)
 2nd Mechanized Granatieri Battalion Cengio, in Rome, (VCC-1 armored personnel carriers)
 3rd Granatieri (Training) Battalion Guardie, in Orvieto
 13th Field Artillery Group Magliana, in Civitavecchia, (M114 155mm towed howitzers)
 Granatieri di Sardegna Logistic Battalion, in Civitavecchia
 Granatieri di Sardegna Anti-tank Company, in Civitavecchia
 Granatieri di Sardegna Engineer Company, in Civitavecchia

X Military Territorial Command 
 X Military Territorial Command (Meridional Military Region), in Naples, responsible for the regions Apulia, Basilicata, Campania and Calabria
 Tank School, in Lecce
 21st Tank (Training) Battalion M.O. Scognamiglio (Reserve), in Lecce
 31st Tank (Training) Battalion M.O. Andreani, in Lecce
 9th Heavy Field Artillery Regiment, in Foggia
 1st Group, 9th Heavy Field Artillery Regiment, in Foggia, (M114 155mm towed howitzers)
 2nd Group, 9th Heavy Field Artillery Regiment, in Barletta, (M114 155mm towed howitzers)
 3rd Group, 9th Heavy Field Artillery Regiment, in Bari, (M114 155mm towed howitzers)
 10th Artillery Specialists Battery, in Foggia
 47th Infantry (Training) Battalion Salento, in Barletta
 89th Infantry (Training) Battalion Salerno, in Salerno
 91st Infantry (Training) Battalion Lucania, in Potenza
 244th Infantry (Training) Battalion Cosenza, in Cosenza
 21st Pioneer Battalion Timavo, in Caserta
 45th Signal Battalion Vulture, in Naples
 10th Mixed Transport Battalion Appia, in Naples
 20th Light Airplanes and Helicopter Squadrons Group Andromeda, at Salerno-Pontecagnano Air Base, (SM-1019 planes and AB-206 helicopters)
  Mechanized Brigade Pinerolo, in Bari
 Pinerolo Command and Signal Battalion, in Bari
 60th Tank Battalion M.O. Locatelli, in Altamura, (Leopard 1A2 main battle tanks)
 9th Mechanized Infantry Battalion Bari, in Trani, (VCC-1 armored personnel carriers)
 13th Mechanized Infantry Battalion Valbella, in Avellino, (VCC-1 armored personnel carriers)
 67th Bersaglieri Battalion Fagarè, in Persano, (VCC-1 armored personnel carriers)
 231st Infantry (Training) Battalion Avellino, in Avellino
 11th Field Artillery Group Teramo, in Persano, (M114 155mm towed howitzers)
 Pinerolo Logistic Battalion, in Bari
 Pinerolo Anti-tank Company, in Bari
 Pinerolo Engineer Company, in Trani

Sicily Military Region 
 Sicily Military Region (R.M.SI.), in Palermo (Sicily region)
 Command Battalion Sicily Military Region, in Palermo
 60th Infantry (Training) Battalion Col di Lana, in Trapani
 51st Pioneer Battalion Simeto, in Palermo (raised 1 October 1983)
 [46th Signal Battalion Mongibello, in Palermo
 30th Light Airplanes and Helicopter Squadrons Group Pegaso, at Catania-Fontanarossa Air Base
 301° Light Airplanes Squadron (SM.1019A planes)
 430° Reconnaissance Helicopter Squadron (AB 206 reconnaissance helicopters)
 530° Multirole Helicopter Squadron (AB 204B/205 multirole helicopters)
 11th Logistics Department, in Messina
 11th Mixed Maneuver Department, in Palermo
 11th Medical Company, in Palermo
 11th Supply Company, in Palermo
 11th Army Repair Workshop, in Palermo
 Type B Military Hospital, in Palermo
 Type B Military Hospital, in Messina
 Garrison Detachment, on Pantelleria island
  Aosta Motorized Brigade, in Messina
 Aosta Command and Signal Battalion, in Messina
 5th Motorized Infantry Battalion Col della Berretta, in Messina
 62nd Motorized Infantry Battalion Sicilia, in Catania
 141st Motorized Infantry Battalion Catanzaro, in Palermo
 62nd Armored Battalion M.O. Jero, in Catania, with a mix of M47 Patton tanks and VCC-2 armored personnel carriers
 24th Field Artillery Group Peloritani, in Messina, with M114 155mm towed howitzers
 Aosta Logistic Battalion, in Messina
 Aosta Anti-tank Company, in Messina
 Aosta Engineer Company, in Syracuse

 Sardinia Autonomous Military Command 
 Sardinia Autonomous Military Command (Sardinia Military Region), in Cagliari, responsible for the island of Sardinia
 1st Armored Infantry Regiment, in Capo Teulada
 1st Armored Infantry Battalion
 Headquarters Company 
 1st Tank Company, 16x Leopard 1A2 main battle tanks
 2nd Bersaglieri Company, 13x M113 armored personnel carriers
 Reconnaissance Helicopter Squadron, 6x AB-206 helicopters
 Self-propelled Artillery Battery, 6x M109 155mm self-propelled howitzers
 2nd Armored (Reserve) Infantry Battalion (configured the same as the 1st Battalion)
 45th Infantry (Training) Battalion Arborea, in Macomer
 151st Infantry (Training) Battalion Sette Comuni, in Cagliari
 152nd Infantry (Training) Battalion Sassari, in Sassari
 21st Light Airplanes and Helicopter Squadrons Group Orsa Maggiore, at Cagliari-Elmas Air Base, (SM-1019 planes and AB-206 helicopters)
 47th Signal Company, in Cagliari
 12th Mixed Transport Battalion, in Cagliari

 Artillery and NBC-defense Inspectorate 
 Artillery and NBC-defense Inspectorate, in Rome
 1st CBRN-defense Battalion Etruria, in Rieti
  Army Anti-aircraft Artillery Command, in Padova
 Command and Signal Battalion, in Padova
 Missile Supply and Repair Battalion, in Montichiari
 Anti-aircraft Material Supply and Repair Battalion, in Bologna
 4th Anti-aircraft Missile Artillery Regiment, in Mantua
 1st Group, 4th Anti-aircraft Missile Artillery Regiment, in Ravenna, (MIM-23 Hawk surface-to-air missiles)
 2st Group, 4th Anti-aircraft Missile Artillery Regiment, in Mantua, (MIM-23 Hawk surface-to-air missiles)
 24th Signal Company, in Mantua
 5th Anti-aircraft Missile Artillery Regiment, in Mestre
 1st Group, 5th Anti-aircraft Missile Artillery Regiment, in San Donà di Piave, (MIM-23 Hawk surface-to-air missiles)
 2nd Group, 5th Anti-aircraft Missile Artillery Regiment, in Rovigo, (MIM-23 Hawk surface-to-air missiles)
 25th Signal Company, in Mestre
 121st Light Anti-aircraft Artillery Regiment''', in Bologna
 1st Group, 121st Light Anti-aircraft Artillery Regiment, in Bologna
 2nd Group, 121st Light Anti-aircraft Artillery Regiment, in Mestre
 3rd Group, 121st Light Anti-aircraft Artillery Regiment, in Rimini
 4th Group, 121st Light Anti-aircraft Artillery Regiment, in Ferrara
 17th Light Anti-aircraft Artillery Group Sforzesca, at Villafranca Air Base
 1st Battery, at Villafranca Air Base
 2nd Battery, at Ghedi Air Base
 3rd Battery, at Istrana Air Base
 4th Battery, at Rimini Air Base
 5th Battery, at Cervia Air Base
 21st (Reserve) Light Anti-aircraft Artillery Group Sparviero, in Bologna
 22nd (Reserve) Light Anti-aircraft Artillery Group Alcione, in Bologna
 235th Infantry (Training) Battalion Piceno, in Ascoli Piceno

 Army Light Aviation Inspectorate 
 Army Light Aviation Inspectorate, in Rome
 1st Army Aviation Regiment Antares, in Viterbo
 11th Transport Helicopter Squadrons Group Ercole, in Viterbo, (CH-47C Chinook heavy-lift helicopters)
 12th Transport Helicopter Squadrons Group Gru, in Viterbo, (CH-47C Chinook heavy-lift helicopters)
 51st Medium Helicopter Squadrons Group Leone, in Viterbo, (AB-412 utility helicopters)

 Engineer Inspectorate 
 Engineer Inspectorate, in Rome
 2nd Bridge Engineer Regiment, in Piacenza
 1st Battalion, in Legnago
 2nd Battalion, in Piacenza
 3rd Battalion, in Piacenza
 Railway Engineer Regiment, in Castel Maggiore
 1st Metal Bridges Battalion, in Castel Maggiore
 2nd (Training) Battalion, in Turin

 Signal Inspectorate 
 Signal Inspectorate, in Rome
 8th ELINT Battalion Tonale, in Anzio
 9th Electronic Warfare Battalion Rombo, in Anzio
 10th Signal Battalion Lanciano, in Rome

 Army General Staff – V Department 
 Army General Staff – V Department, Rome
 11th Transport Battalion Flaminia, in Rome

 Carabinieri 
Until 2000 the Carabinieri were an "Arma" (corps) of the Italian Army tasked with police duties in every Italian city and village. The Carabinieri's higher units in 1984 were:

 Carabinieri Corps General Command, in Rome
 1st Division, in Milan, responsible for Northern Italy
 2nd Division, in Rome, responsible for Central Italy
 3rd Division, in Naples, responsible for Southern Italy
 Schools and Special Units Division, in Rome

Divisions commanded brigades, which were each responsible for policing a number of Italian regions. The brigades were further divided into Legions (Regiments), which were each responsible for policing a small region or part of a larger region. Legiones were further divided into Groups (Battalions), which were responsible for policing a province. The groups were further divided into stations, one of which could be found in every Italian city or comune.

The Carabinieri also provided military police units for the Italian Army, Italian Navy, and Italian Air Force. The units under direct command of the Carabinieri Corps General Command were:

 Carabinieri Corps General Command, in Rome
 President of the Republic Guards Command, in Rome
 President of the Republic Carabinieri Command, in Rome
 Army General Staff Autonomous Carabinieri Group, in Rome
 Air Force Carabinieri Command, in Rome
 1st Air Region Carabinieri Group, in Milan
 2nd Air Region Carabinieri Group, in Rome
 3rd Air Region Carabinieri Group, in Bari
 Navy Carabinieri Command, in Rome
 Navy Carabinieri Group, in Rome
 Carabinieri Helicopter Centre, at Pratica di Mare Air Base
 1st Helicopter Squadron, at Turin Airport
 2nd Helicopter Squadron, at Orio al Serio Airport
 3rd Helicopter Squadron, at Bolzano Airport
 4th Helicopter Squadron, at Pisa-San Giusto Airport
 5th Helicopter Squadron, at Falconara Marittima
 6th Helicopter Squadron, at Bari Airport
 7th Helicopter Squadron, at Pontecagnano Airport
 8th Helicopter Squadron, at Vibo Valentia Airport
 9th Helicopter Squadron, at Palermo Airport
 10th Helicopter Squadron, at Olbia Airport
 11th Helicopter Squadron, at Cagliari Elmas Airport

 1st Division 
 1 Divisione, in Milan, responsible for Northern Italy
 I Brigata, in Turin, responsible for the Aosta, Liguria, and Piedmont regions
 Legione di Torino, responsible for the Aosta region and the Northern part of the Piedmont region
 Gruppo di Aosta
 Gruppo di Novara
 Gruppo di Vercelli
 Gruppo di Turin
 Legione di Alessandria, responsible for the Southern part of the Piedmont region
 Gruppo di Alessandria
 Gruppo di Asti
 Gruppo di Cuneo
 Legione di Genova, responsible for the Liguria region
 Gruppo di Genova
 Gruppo di La Spezia
 Gruppo di Imperia
 Gruppo di Savona
 II Brigata, in Milan, responsible for the Western part of the Lombardy region
 Legione di Milano, responsible for the Lombardy region
 Gruppo di Milano I (Province of Milano)
 Gruppo di Milano II (Province of Monza)
 Gruppo di Milano III (Province of Lodi)
 Gruppo di Como
 Gruppo di Varese
 Gruppo di Pavia
 Legione di Brescia, responsible for the Eastern part of the Lombardy region
 Gruppo di Brescia
 Gruppo di Mantova
 Gruppo di Cremona
 Gruppo di Bergamo
 Gruppo di Sondrio
 III Brigata, in Padua, responsible for the Friuli-Venezia Giulia, Trentino-Alto Adige, and Veneto regions
 Legione di Padova, responsible for most of the Veneto region
 Gruppo di Padova
 Gruppo di Rovigo
 Gruppo di Verona
 Gruppo di Vicenza
 Gruppo di Venezia
 Gruppo di Treviso
 Legione di Udine, responsible for the Friuli-Venezia Giulia region
 Gruppo di Udine
 Gruppo di Pordenone
 Gruppo di Gorizia
 Gruppo di Trieste
 Legione di Bolzano, responsible for the Trentino-Alto Adige region and the Province of Belluno of the Veneto region
 Gruppo di Bolzano
 Gruppo di Trento
 Gruppo di Belluno

 2nd Division 
 2 Divisione, in Rome, responsible for Central Italy
 IV Brigata, in Bologna, responsible for the Emilia-Romagna and Marche regions
 Legione di Bologna, responsible for the Eastern part of the Emilia-Romagna region
 Gruppo di Bologna
 Gruppo di Ferrara
 Gruppo di Forlì
 Gruppo di Ravenna
 Legione di Parma, responsible for the Western part of the Emilia-Romagna region
 Gruppo di Parma
 Gruppo di Piacenza
 Gruppo di Modena
 Gruppo di Reggio Emilia
 Legione di Ancona, responsible for the Marche region
 Gruppo di Ancona
 Gruppo di Macerata
 Gruppo di Pesaro
 Gruppo di Ascoli Piceno
 V Brigata, in Florence, responsible for the Tuscany and Umbria regions
 Legione di Firenze, responsible for the Eastern part of the Tuscany region
 Gruppo di Firenze
 Gruppo di Pistoia
 Gruppo di Siena
 Gruppo di Arezzo
 Legione di Livorno, responsible for the Western part of the Tuscany region
 Gruppo di Livorno
 Gruppo di Pisa
 Gruppo di Grosseto
 Gruppo di Lucca
 Gruppo di Massa Carrara
 Legione di Perugia, responsible for the Umbria region
 Gruppo di Perugia
 Gruppo di Terni
 VI Brigata, in Rome, responsible for the Lazio and Sardinia regions
 Legione di Roma, responsible for the Province of Rome
 Gruppo di Roma I
 Gruppo di Roma II
 Gruppo di Roma III (in Frascati)
 Legione Lazio, responsible for the areas of the Lazio region outside of the Province of Rome
 Gruppo di Rieti
 Gruppo di Latina
 Gruppo di Viterbo
 Gruppo di Frosinone
 Legione di Cagliari, responsible for the Sardinia region
 Gruppo di Cagliari
 Gruppo di Oristano
 Gruppo di Nuoro
 Gruppo di Sassari

 3rd Division 
 3 Divisione, in Naples, responsible for Southern Italy
 VII Brigata, in Naples, responsible for the Basilicata, Calabria, and Campania regions
 Legione di Napoli, responsible for most of the Campania region
 Gruppo di Napoli I, responsible for the Province of Naples
 Gruppo di Napoli II, responsible for the Avellino, Benevento, and Caserta provinces 
 Legione di Salerno, responsible for the Basilicata region and the Province of Salerno of the Campania region
 Gruppo di Salerno
 Gruppo di Matera
 Gruppo di Potenza
 Legione di Catanzaro, responsible for the Calabria region
 Gruppo di Catanzaro
 Gruppo di Reggio Calabria
 Gruppo di Cosenza
 VIII Brigata, in Bari, responsible for the Abruzzo, Apulia, and Molise regions
 Legione di Bari, responsible for the Apulia region
 Gruppo di Bari
 Gruppo di Brindisi
 Gruppo di Foggia
 Gruppo di Lecce
 Gruppo di Taranto
 Legione di Chieti, responsible for the Abruzzo and Molise regions
 Gruppo di Chieti
 Gruppo di Pescara
 Gruppo di Teramo
 Gruppo di L'Aquila
 Gruppo di Isernia
 Gruppo di Campobasso
 IX Brigata, in Palermo, responsible for the Sicily region
 Legione di Palermo, responsible for the Eastern part of the Sicily region
 Gruppo di Palermo
 Gruppo di Agrigento
 Gruppo di Trapani
 Gruppo di Caltanissetta
 Legione di Messina, responsible for Western part of the Sicily region
 Gruppo di Messina
 Gruppo di Catania
 Gruppo di Enna
 Gruppo di Ragusa
 Gruppo di Siracusa

 Schools and Special Units Division 
 Schools and Special Units Division, in Rome
 Carabinieri Officers School, in Rome
 X Brigata, in Rome, the brigade trained all recruits and Non-commissioned Officers of the Carabinieri corps.
 Carabinieri Non-commissioned Officers School, in Florence
 1st Carabinieri Non-commissioned Officers Recruits Battalion, in Velletri
 Carabinieri Recruits School Roma, in Rome
 1st Carabinieri Recruits Battalion, in Rome
 2nd Carabinieri Recruits Battalion, in Campobasso
 3rd Carabinieri Recruits Battalion, in Iglesias
 Carabinieri Recruits School Benevento, in Benevento
 1st Carabinieri Recruits Battalion, in Benevento
 2nd Carabinieri Recruits Battalion, in Chieti
 Carabinieri Recruits School Torino, in Turin
 1st Carabinieri Recruits Battalion, in Turin
 2nd Carabinieri Recruits Battalion, in Fossano
 XI Brigata, in Rome, the XI Brigade consisted of light infantry battalions, which doubled as riot police during peacetime, and the 7th and 13th armored battalions, which were tasked with rear-area security duties for the army's two frontline corps.
 Mounted Carabinieri Regiment, in Rome
 1st Carabinieri Battalion Piemonte, in Moncalieri
 2nd Carabinieri Battalion Liguria, in Genoa
 3rd Carabinieri Battalion Lombardia, in Milan
 4th Carabinieri Battalion Veneto, in Mestre
 5th Carabinieri Battalion Emilia-Romagna, in Bologna
 6th Carabinieri Battalion Toscana, in Florence
 7th Armored Carabinieri Battalion M.O. Petrucelli, in Laives, (M47 Patton tanks and M113 armored personnel carriers) (permanently detached to the 4th Alpine Army Corps)
 8th Carabinieri Battalion Lazio, in Rome
 9th Carabinieri Battalion Sardegna, in Cagliari
 10th Carabinieri Battalion Campania, in Naples
 11th Carabinieri Battalion Puglia, in Bari
 12th Carabinieri Battalion Sicilia, in Palermo
 13th Armored Carabinieri Battalion M.O. Gallo, in Gorizia, (Leopard 1A2 main battle tanks and VCC-2 armored personnel carriers) (permanently detached to the 5th Army Corps)

 Ministry of Defense 
The following units were permanently attached to the Italian Ministry of Defense in Rome:

 Ministry of Defense Autonomous Goupment Command, in Rome
 10th Inter-arms Transport Battalion Salaria, in Rome

 NATO COMLANDSOUTH 
The following units were permanently attached to NATO's Allied Land Forces Southern Europe in Verona:

 Tactical-psychological Support Battalion Monte Grappa'', in Verona
 Mixed Telecommunication Support Group (Italian Army/Italian Air Force), in Verona

References 

Italian Army
Army units and formations of Italy post-1946